Woodborough railway station is a former railway station in Woodborough, Wiltshire, UK on the Reading to Taunton line. The station closed in 1966 as part of the Beeching cuts. Today the line is still in use and the station's sidings remain in place.

References

 

Beeching closures in England
Disused railway stations in Wiltshire
Former Great Western Railway stations
Railway stations in Great Britain opened in 1862
Railway stations in Great Britain closed in 1966
1862 establishments in England